Karnataka Shuddha Saveri is a rāgam in Carnatic music (musical scale of South Indian classical music). It is an audava rāgam (or owdava rāgam, meaning pentatonic scale). It is a janya rāgam (derived scale), as it does not have all the seven swaras (musical notes).

This scale is known as Shuddha Sāveri in the Muthuswami Dikshitar school of music. This scale is quite different from the popular Shuddha Saveri pentatonic scale.

Structure and Lakshana 

Karnataka Shuddha Saveri is a symmetric rāgam that does not contain gandharam or nishādam. It is a symmetric pentatonic scale (audava-audava ragam in Carnatic music classification - audava meaning 'of 5'). Its  structure (ascending and descending scale) is as follows (see swaras in Carnatic music for details on below notation and terms):

 : 
 : 

The notes used in this scale are shadjam, shuddha rishabham, shuddha madhyamam, panchamam and shuddha dhaivatham. It is considered a janya rāgam of Kanakangi, the 1st Melakarta rāgam, though it can be derived from 8 other melakarta rāgams, by dropping both gandharam and nishādam.

Popular compositions
This rāgam lends itself for creative elaboration and creative exploration due to the use of shuddha notes.

Ekamresha Nayike composed by Muthuswami Dikshitar

Film Songs: Tamil

Related rāgams 
This section covers the theoretical and scientific aspect of this rāgam.

Graha bhedam 
Karnataka Shuddha Saveri's notes when shifted using Graha bhedam, yields 1 popular pentatonic rāgam, Amritavarshini. Graha bhedam is the step taken in keeping the relative note frequencies same, while shifting the shadjam to the next note in the rāgam. For more details and illustration of this concept refer Graha bhedam on Amritavarshini.

Scale similarities 
Saveri is a rāgam which has the ascending scale of Karnataka Shuddha Saveri and descending scale of Mayamalavagowla. Its  structure is S R1 M1 P D1 S : S N3 D1 P M1 G3 R1 S
Gunakri is a raga from the Hindustani tradition with identical intervals which is sometimes classified in the same group.
Malahari

Notes

References

Janya ragas